Asterolasia asteriscophora, commonly known as lemon starbush, is a species of slender, erect shrub in the family Rutaceae and is endemic to southern continental Australia. It has woolly, star-shaped hairs on its young branches, variably-shaped leaves covered with brownish or whitish hairs on the underside, and yellow flowers with woolly brown, star-shaped hairs on the back.

Description
The upper surface of the leaves is more or less glabrous and the lower surface is covered with woolly, brownish or whitish hairs. Flowering occurs in spring.

Taxonomy
This species was first described in 1855 by Ferdinand von Mueller who gave it the name Phebalium asteriscophora and published the description in Transactions and Proceedings of the Victorian Institute for the Advancement of Science. In 1917 George Claridge Druce changed the name to Asterolasia asteriscophora.

In 2002, Bryan J. Mole described two subspecies and the names have been accepted by the Australian Plant Census:
 Asterolasia asteriscophora subsp. albiflora that has white, rarely pale lemon-coloured petals with smaller leaves and flowers that the autonym;

Distribution and habitat
Asterolasia asteriscophora is widely distributed along the Great Dividing Range from the Tumut district in New South Wales to the Macedon and Emerald districts in Victoria. It grows in forest and along the eges of watercourses. Subspecies albiflora is only known from the Emerald-Avonsleigh and is threatened by urban development.

References

asterisocphora
Flora of Victoria (Australia)
Sapindales of Australia
Flora of New South Wales
Plants described in 1855
Taxa named by Ferdinand von Mueller